The Hogback Covered Bridge is a historic covered bridge near Winterset, Iowa. Named after a nearby limestone ridge, it was built in 1884 by Harvey P. Jones and George K. Foster over the North River on Douglas Township Road. The  bridge was designed with a Town lattice truss system. It was built with steel pylons to support the main span.

The Hogback Bridge was originally one of 19 covered bridges in Madison County; there are only six remaining covered bridges in the county. In 1992, the bridge was rehabilitated for the cost of $118,810 ($ today). The Hogback Covered Bridge was added to the National Register of Historic Places in 1976.

See also
List of bridges documented by the Historic American Engineering Record in Iowa

References

External links

Covered bridges on the National Register of Historic Places in Iowa
Road bridges in Iowa
Tourist attractions in Madison County, Iowa
Bridges in Madison County, Iowa
Bridges completed in 1884
Wooden bridges in Iowa
Historic American Engineering Record in Iowa
National Register of Historic Places in Madison County, Iowa
Lattice truss bridges in the United States